Bernd Heidicker (born 5 April 1978 in Recklinghausen) is a German rower.

References 
 
 

1978 births
Living people
People from Recklinghausen
Sportspeople from Münster (region)
Olympic rowers of Germany
Rowers at the 2004 Summer Olympics
World Rowing Championships medalists for Germany
German male rowers